the 2018 Kuwait Super Cup was between league and Emir Cup champions Kuwait SC and Crown Prince Cup winners Qadsia SC.

References

External links
Kuwait League Fixtures and Results at FIFA
Kuwaiti Super Cup (Arabic)
goalzz.com - Super Cup

Super Cup
Kuwait SC matches
Kuwait Super Cup